Uranoscopus is a genus of stargazer fish from the family Uranoscopidae. The name Uranoscopus is from the Greek, ouranos, "sky" and skopein, "to watch".

Species
There are 25 species in the genus:
 Uranoscopus affinis Cuvier, 1829
 Uranoscopus albesca Regan, 1915 - Longspine stargazer
 Uranoscopus arafurensis Prokofiev, 2020
 Uranoscopus archionema Regan, 1921
 Uranoscopus bauchotae Brüss, 1987
 Uranoscopus brunneus R. Fricke, 2018
 Uranoscopus bicinctus Temminck & Schlegel, 1843 - Marbled stargazer
 Uranoscopus cadenati Poll, 1959 - West African stargazer
 Uranoscopus chinensis Guichenot, 1882
 Uranoscopus cognatus Cantor, 1849 - Two-spined yellow-tail stargazer
 Uranoscopus crassiceps Alcock, 1890
 Uranoscopus dahlakensis Brüss, 1987
 Uranoscopus dollfusi Brüss, 1987 - Dollfus' stargazer
 Uranoscopus filibarbis Cuvier, 1829
 Uranoscopus fuscomaculatus Kner, 1868
 Uranoscopus guttatus Cuvier, 1829 - Dollfus' stargrazer 
 Uranoscopus japonicus Houttuyn, 1782
 Uranoscopus kaianus Günther, 1880 - Kai stargazer
 Uranoscopus marisrubri Brüss, 1987
 Uranoscopus marmoratus Cuvier, 1829
 Uranoscopus oligolepis Bleeker, 1878
 Uranoscopus polli Cadenat, 1951 - Whitespotted stargazer
 Uranoscopus rosette Randall & Arnold, 2012
 Uranoscopus scaber  Linnaeus, 1758 - Atlantic stargazer
 Uranoscopus sulphureus  Valenciennes, 1832 - Whitemargin stargazer
 Uranoscopus tosae  (Jordan & Hubbs, 1925)

References

 
Uranoscopidae
Marine fish genera
Taxa named by Carl Linnaeus